Heliopolis War Cemetery (which includes the Heliopolis (Port Tewfik) Memorial and the Heliopolis (Aden) Memorial) is a war cemetery in the Heliopolis district of Cairo, Egypt for British and Commonwealth service personnel. It is maintained by the Commonwealth War Graves Commission. 1,742 British and Commonwealth casualties of World War II are buried or commemorated there, and it contains 83 war graves of people of other nationalities. The cemetery was designed by Hubert Worthington.

The Heliopolis (Port Tewfik) Memorial was designed by Captain Charles Sargeant Jagger MC. It commemorates 4,000 men who served and died with the British Indian Army during the First World War in Egypt and Palestine, and who have no known grave. The panels bearing the names, erected in the entrance pavilions to Heliopolis War Cemetery, were unveiled by the Indian Ambassador to Egypt in October 1980. The memorial was created to replace the original memorial at Port Tewfik, which existed at the South end of the Suez Canal. It suffered severe damage during the Israeli-Egyptian conflict of 1967 and Yom Kippur War in 1973 and was eventually demolished.

The Heliopolis (Aden) Memorial commemorates more than 600 men of the Commonwealth forces who died in the defence of Aden during the First World War and who have no known grave. The panels bearing the names, erected in the pavilions to the rear of Heliopolis War Cemetery, replace the original memorial, sited at Steamer Point, Aden which was demolished, as a result of port reconstruction work, in 1967.

Notable graves and commemorations 
 Stephen Haggard
 Wilfrid Lewis Lloyd
 Geoffrey Nares
 Badlu Singh

See also 
 Port Tewfik Memorial

References

External links
 

Cemeteries in Egypt
Commonwealth War Graves Commission cemeteries in Egypt